Four ships of the United States Navy have borne the name USS Tecumseh, in honor of Tecumseh (ca. 1768–1813), a Shawnee Indian chief.

 , was a  monitor, commissioned on 19 April 1864. It was lost with almost all hands on 5 August, at the Battle of Mobile Bay.
 , was a tugboat, originally named Edward Luckenbach, purchased by the Navy in 1898 and renamed. She served off and on until she was struck from the Navy list ca. 1945.
 , was a  ballistic missile submarine, commissioned in 1964 and struck in 1993.

United States Navy ship names